Cobb County is a county in the U.S. state of Georgia, located in the Atlanta metropolitan area in the north central portion of the state. As of 2020 Census, the population was 766,149. Its county seat and largest city is Marietta.

Along with several adjoining counties, Cobb County was established on December 3, 1832, by the Georgia General Assembly from the large Cherokee County territory—land northwest of the Chattahoochee River which the state acquired from the Cherokee Nation and redistributed to settlers via lottery, following the passage of the federal Indian Removal Act. The county was named for Thomas Willis Cobb, a U.S. representative and senator from Georgia. It is believed that Marietta was named for his wife, Mary. Cobb County is included in the Atlanta metropolitan area and is situated immediately to the northwest of Atlanta's city limits. Major League Baseball's Atlanta Braves have played home games at Truist Park in Cumberland since 2017.

In 2003, the U.S. Census Bureau ranked Cobb County as the most educated in the state of Georgia and 12th-most in the United States. It has ranked among the top 100 highest-income counties in the United States. In October 2017, Cobb was ranked as the "Least Obese County in Georgia".

History
Cobb County was one of nine Georgia counties carved out of the disputed territory of the Cherokee Nation in 1832. It was the 81st county in Georgia and named for Judge Thomas Willis Cobb, who served as a U.S. Senator, state representative, and superior court judge. It is believed that the county seat of Marietta was named for Judge Cobb's wife, Mary. The state started acquiring right-of-way for the Western & Atlantic Railroad in 1836. A train began running between Marietta and Marthasville (modern day Atlanta) in 1845.

During the American Civil War, some Confederate troops were trained at a camp in Big Shanty (now Kennesaw), where the Andrews Raid occurred, starting the Great Locomotive Chase. There were battles of New Hope Church May 25, 1864, Pickett's Mill May 27, and Dallas May 28. These were followed by the prolonged series of battles through most of June 1864 until very early July: the Battle of Marietta and the Battle of Noonday Creek. The Battle of Allatoona Pass on October 5, 1864, occurred as Sherman was starting his march through Georgia. Union forces burnt most houses and confiscated or burnt crops. The Battle of Kennesaw Mountain on June 27, 1864, was the site of the only major Confederate victory in General William T. Sherman's invasion of Georgia. Despite the victory, Union forces outflanked the Confederates. In 1915, Leo Frank, the Jewish supervisor of an Atlanta pencil factory who was convicted of murdering one of his workers, thirteen-year-old Mary Phagan, was kidnapped from his jail cell and brought to Frey's Gin, two miles (3 km) east of Marietta, where he was lynched.

Cotton farming in the area peaked from the 1890s through the 1920s. Low prices during the Great Depression resulted in the cessation of cotton farming throughout Cobb County. The price of cotton went from 16¢ per pound (35¢/kg) in 1920 to 9½¢ (21¢/kg) in 1930. This resulted in a cotton bust for the county, which had stopped growing the product but was milling it. This bust was followed by the Great Depression. To help combat the bust, the state started work on a road in 1922 that would later become U.S. 41, later replaced by Cobb Parkway in the late 1940s and early 1950s.

In 1942, Bell Aircraft opened a Marietta plant to manufacture B-29 bombers and Marietta Army Airfield was founded. Both were closed after World War II, but reopened during the Korean War, when the air field was acquired by the Air Force, renamed Dobbins AFB, and the plant by Lockheed. During the Korean and Vietnam Wars, Lockheed Marietta was the leading manufacturer of military transport planes, including the C-130 Hercules and the C-5 Galaxy. "In Cobb County and other sprawling Cold War suburbs from Orange County to Norfolk/Hampton Roads, the direct link between federal defense spending and local economic prosperity structured a bipartisan political culture of hawkish conservatism and material self-interest on issues of national security."

When county home rule was enacted statewide by amendment to the Georgia state constitution in the early 1960s, Ernest W. Barrett became the first chairman of the new county commission. The county courthouse, built in 1888, was demolished, spurring a law that now prevents counties from doing so without a referendum. In the 1960s and 1970s, Cobb transformed from rural to suburban, as integration spurred white flight from the city of Atlanta, which by 1970 was majority-African-American. Real-estate booms drew rural white southerners and Rust Belt transplants, both groups mostly first-generation white-collar workers. Cobb County was the home of former segregationist and Georgia governor Lester Maddox (1966–71). In 1975, Cobb voters elected John Birch Society leader Larry McDonald to Congress, running in opposition to desegregation busing. A conservative Democrat, McDonald called for investigations into alleged plots by the Rockefellers and the Soviet Union to impose "socialist-one-world-government" and co-founded the Western Goals Foundation. In 1983, McDonald died aboard Korean Air Lines Flight 007, shot down by a Soviet fighter jet over restricted airspace. I-75 through the county is now named for him.

In 1990, Republican Congressmen Newt Gingrich became Representative of a new district centered around Cobb County. In 1994, as Republicans took control of the U.S. House of Representatives for the first time in almost fifty years, Gingrich became Speaker of the House, thrusting Cobb County into the national spotlight.

In 1993, county commissioners passed a resolution condemning homosexuality and cut off funding for the arts after complaints about a community theater. After protests from gay rights organizations, organizers of the 1996 Summer Olympics pulled events out of Cobb County, including the Olympic Torch Relay. The county's inns were nevertheless filled at 100% of capacity for two months during the event.

In the 1990s and 2000s, Cobb's demographics changed. As Atlanta's gentrification reversed decades of white flight, middle-class African-Americans and Russian, Bosnian, Chinese, Indian, Brazilian, Mexican and Central American immigrants moved to older suburbs in south and southwest Cobb. In 2010, African-American Democrat David Scott was elected to Georgia's 13th congressional district, which included many of those suburbs. Cobb became the first Georgia county to participate in the Immigration and Nationality Act Section 287(g) enabling local law officers to enforce immigration law.

Geography

The county is located in the upper Piedmont region of the state, with a few mountains located within the county, considered to be part of the southernmost extensions of the Appalachian Mountains.

The county is divided between two major basins. Most runoff flows into the Middle Chattahoochee-Lake Harding and Upper Chattahoochee River sub-basins of the ACF River Basin (Apalachicola-Chattahoochee-Flint River Basin) along the southeastern border, directly via Willeo Creek, Sope Creek (Sewell Creek), Rottenwood Creek (Powers Creek, Poorhouse Creek, Poplar Creek), Nickajack Creek and others. The large Sweetwater Creek is the other major stream, carrying the waters of Noses Creek (Ward Creek, Olley Creek, Mud Creek), Powder Springs Creek (Rakestraw Creek, Mill Creek) and others into the Chattahoochee. A ridge from Lost Mountain in the west, to Kennesaw Mountain in the north-central, to Sweat Mountain in the extreme northeast, divides the far north-northwest of the county into the Etowah River sub-basin of the ACT River Basin (Coosa-Tallapoosa River Basin), which includes Lake Allatoona. Noonday Creek (Little Noonday Creek) flows northward into the lake, as does Allatoona Creek, which forms a major arm of the lake. Proctor Creek forms the much older Lake Acworth, which in turn empties directly into Lake Allatoona under the Lake Acworth Drive (Georgia 92) bridge. North Cobb is in the Coosa River basin.

There are several high points in Cobb County.
 Sweat Mountain: in the extreme northeast portion, runs along the border with Cherokee County, and is the metro area's major antenna farm
 Blackjack Mountain: a low ridge between central and east Cobb
 Kennesaw Mountain: the highest point in the county and in the entire suburban area of metro Atlanta, located in the north-northwest between Kennesaw and Marietta
 Little Kennesaw Mountain: an offshoot of Kennesaw
 Lost Mountain: in western Cobb
 Pine Mountain: west-northwest of Kennesaw Mountain, between Kennesaw and Due West
 Brushy Mountain: near Kennesaw Mountain, just southeast of Barrett Parkway at Cobb Parkway
 Vinings Mountain or Mount Wilkinson: overlooks the town of Vinings

Adjacent counties

 Cherokee County – north
 Fulton County – southeast
 Douglas County – southwest
 Paulding County – west
 Bartow County – northwest

Addressing
Despite the lack of a grid system of city blocks though the county, all street addresses have their numeric origin at the southwest corner of the town square in Marietta.

Geocodes and world's largest toll-free calling area

Originally in area code 404, the county was moved into area code 770 in 1995, and overlaid by area code 678 in 1998. Prior to 1995, those with phones tied to the Woodstock telephone exchange (prefixes 924, 926, 928, later 516 and 591) could also call the Canton exchange (479, later 445, then 704) as a local call. This became moot, along with other dual-zone exchanges in metro Atlanta, when the exurban exchanges (including Canton) were fully made a part of what was already the world's largest toll-free calling zone. It is a zone spanning , with four active telephone area codes, and local calling extending into portions of two others.

Cobb's FIPS county code is 13067. Because the National Weather Service has not subdivided the county, its WRSAME code is 013067, for receiving targeted weather warnings from NOAA Weather Radio. The county is primarily within the broadcast range of one weather radio station: KEC80, on 162.550 MHz, transmitted to all of metro Atlanta and broadcast from NWSFO Peachtree City. The secondary station is the much newer WWH23 on 162.425 from Buchanan, which also transmits warnings for Cobb but has reception mainly in the western part of the county.

Demographics

2020 census

As of the 2020 United States census, there were 766,149 people, 286,952 households, and 191,533 families residing in the county.

2010 Census
As of the 2010 United States Census, there were 688,078 people, 260,056 households, and 175,357 families residing in the county. The racial makeup of the county was 62.21% white, 24.96% black or African American, 4.46% Asian, 0.34% American Indian, 0.1% Pacific islander, 5.28% from other races, and 2.71% from two or more races. Those of Hispanic or Latino origin made up 12.26% of the population. In terms of ancestry, 10.4% were German, 10.0% were English, 9.3% were Irish, and 8.6% were American.

Of the 260,056 households, 36.7% had children under the age of 18 living with them, 50.2% were married couples living together, 13.0% had a female householder with no husband present, 32.6% were non-families, and 25.6% of all households were made up of individuals. The average household size was 2.61 and the average family size was 3.17. The median age was 35.4 years.

The median income for a household in the county was $65,522 and the median income for a family was $78,920. Males had a median income of $55,200 versus $43,367 for females. The per capita income for the county was $33,110. About 7.6% of families and 10.6% of the population were below the poverty line, including 14.5% of those under age 18 and 7.2% of those age 65 or over.

2000 Census
As of 2000, there were 697,553 people, 248,303 households, and 169,178 families residing in the county. The racial makeup of the county in 2000 was 72.4% White, 18.8% Black, 0.3% Native American, 3.06% Asian, 0.0% Pacific Islander, 5.3% from other races, and 1.87% from two or more races. 7.73% of the population was Hispanic or Latino of any race.

There were 248,303 households, out of which 35.80% had children under the age of 18 living with them, 54.30% were married couples living together, 10.70% had a female householder with no husband present, and 31.20% were non-families. 23.20% of all households were made up of individuals, and 4.10% had someone living alone who was 65 years of age or older. The average household size was 2.71 and the average family size was 3.25.

In the county, 26.10% of the population was under the age of 18, 9.00% from 18 to 24, 36.50% from 25 to 44, 21.50% from 45 to 64, and 6.90% was 65 years of age or older. The median age was 33 years. For every 100 females, there were 98.50 males. For every 100 females age 18 and over, there were 95.90 males.

As of 2007, the median income was $70,472. The per capita income for the county was $32,740. About 6.0% of families and 9.4% of the population were below the poverty line, including 9.1% of those under age 18 and 7.8% of those age 65 or over.

Education

Public schools
 Cobb County School District (serves all county locations except the city of Marietta)
 Marietta City Schools (serves city of Marietta locations)

Private schools
 Cumberland Christian Academy, Austell (K–12)
 Dominion Christian School, Marietta (middle school–12)
 Midway Covenant Christian School, Powder Springs (preK–12)
 Mount Paran Christian School, Kennesaw (preK–12)
 North Cobb Christian School, Kennesaw (K–12)
 The Walker School, Marietta (preK–12)
 Whitefield Academy, Mableton (preK–12)
 East Cobb Christian School, Marietta (K–8)

Colleges and universities
 Chattahoochee Technical College
 Kennesaw State University
 Life University

Libraries
Cobb County maintains the Cobb County Public Library System. The libraries provide resources such as books, videos, internet access, printing, and computer classes. The libraries in the CCPLS are:

 Acworth Library
 East Cobb Library
 East Marietta Library
 Gritters Library
 Kemp Memorial Library
 Kennesaw Library
 Lewis A. Ray Library
 Mountain View Regional Library
 Powder Springs Library
 Sibley Library
 South Cobb Regional Library
 Stratton Library
 Sweetwater Valley Library
 Switzer Library
 Vinings Library
 West Cobb Regional Library

The Smyrna Public Library is a city-owned library in Smyrna, and is not part of the county system.

Government and elections

Under Georgia's home rule provision, county governments have free rein to legislate on all matters within the county, provided that such legislation does not conflict with state or federal laws or constitutions.

Cobb County is governed by a five-member board of commissioners, which has both legislative and executive authority within the county. The chairman of the board is elected county-wide. The other four commissioners are elected from single-member districts. The board hires a county manager who oversees day-to-day operations of the county's executive departments.

Cobb County Board of Commissioners

County residents also elect a sheriff, district attorney, probate court judge, clerk of superior court, clerk of the state court, state court solicitor, chief magistrate judge (who then appoints other magistrate court judges), superior court judges, state court judges, tax commissioner, surveyor, and a seven-member board of education. In addition to the county sheriff, the constitutional chief law enforcement officer of the county, Cobb County has a separate police department under the authority of the Board of Commissioners. The sheriff oversees the jail, to which everyone arrested under state law is taken, regardless of the city or other area of the county where it happens, or which police department makes the arrest.

Each city has a separate police department, answerable to its governing council. Marietta, Smyrna, and Austell have separate fire departments, with the Cobb County Fire Department being the authority having jurisdiction over Kennesaw, Acworth, Powder Springs, and unincorporated areas. Cobb 911 covers unincorporated areas and the city of Marietta. Kennesaw and Acworth jointly operate a small 911 call center (PSAP) upstairs in Kennesaw city hall, dispatching the police departments in both cities, and forwarding fire calls to Cobb. Smyrna operates a separate PSAP while offering dispatch services to the city of Powder Springs. Austell operates its own separate 911 system.

The county retails potable water to much of the county, and wholesales it to various cities.

The current County Manager is Dr. Jackie R. McMorris.

Politics
From 1964 until 2012, the county was a Republican stronghold in presidential elections. The only time during this period that the county supported a Democrat was in 1976, when native son Jimmy Carter swept every county in the state. Before 1960, it was a typical "Solid South" Democratic county, except when Warren G. Harding came close to carrying it in 1920, and when Herbert Hoover won it by nine points due to anti-Catholic voting against Al Smith in 1928.

In the latter 20th century, the county developed a reputation as a conservative stronghold. However, due to rapid racial and ethnic demographic changes since the 1990s, the county has increasingly supported the Democratic Party. In 2016, when Hillary Clinton became the first Democrat to win Cobb County since Carter, and the first non-Georgian Democrat since John F. Kennedy in 1960. The county then supported Joe Biden in 2020 by 14 points–the best showing for a Democrat since Carter's 17-point win in 1976, and the best for a non-Georgian Democrat since Kennedy. This was crucial to Biden winning the state for the Democrats for the first time since 1992.

In 2018, Stacey Abrams became the first Democrat to win Cobb County in a gubernatorial election since 1986, when Joe Frank Harris swept every county statewide.

2020 voter suppression controversy
In 2020, in the turmoil surrounding the election defeat of Donald Trump, the chairman of the Cobb County Republicans and another person challenged the election results in an attempt to remove 16,024 Cobb County voters from eligibility to vote in the runoff election for both Georgia senators, scheduled for January 5, 2021. The county Board of Elections held a hearing to decide whether there was probable cause to move forward with hearings for each name on the list. The Board's attorney stated that there was not probable cause and gave reasons. After a brief discussion, the board voted unanimously to deny the challenge.

Taxes
In addition to the 4% statewide sales tax, Cobb County levies an additional 2% for special projects, each 1% subject to separate renewal every few years by countywide referendum (including within its cities). This funds mainly transportation and parks. Cobb levies a 1% tax to lower property taxes, but only for the public school budget, and not the additional 1% HOST homestead exemption for general funds. The county has also voted not to pay the extra 1% to join MARTA.

At the beginning of 2006, Cobb became the last county in the state to raise the tax to 6%, which also doubled the tax on food to 2%. The SPLOST barely passed by a 114 vote margin, or less than one-quarter of a percent, in a September 2005 referendum. The revenue was to go to a new county courthouse, expanded jail, various transportation projects, and the purchasing of property for parks and green space. In 2008, the school tax was renewed for a third term, funding the Marietta and Cobb school systems.

Economy
The Cobb County School District is Cobb County's largest employer, employing over 15,000 people.

Private corporations include:
 The Home Depot Atlanta Store Support Center, world headquarters
 The Weather Channel headquarters
 InTown Suites headquarters
 Lockheed Martin Aeronautical Plant, located next to Dobbins Air Reserve Base in unincorporated Cobb
 Kool Smiles (Marietta)
 GE Power headquarters
 Papa Johns "additional" headquarters

Retail
Shopping centers in the county include:
Cobb Center
Cobb Place - 335,000 sq. ft., opened 1987, original anchors Uptons, Service Merchandise, Lechmere. Now anchors include DSW and the largest concentration of furniture and home retailers in Metro Atlanta including Bassett Furniture, American Signature Furniture, Ashley Furniture, Bed Bath & Beyond, Cost Plus World Market and Hobbytown USA.
Cumberland Mall
Town Center at Cobb

Diplomatic missions
The Consulate-General of Costa Rica in Atlanta is located in Suite 100 at 1870 The Exchange in an unincorporated section of Cobb County.

Transportation

Major highways

  Interstate 20
  Interstate 75
  Interstate 285
  Interstate 575
  U.S. Route 41
  U.S. Route 78
  U.S. Route 278
  State Route 3
  State Route 5
  State Route 5 Connector
  State Route 6
  State Route 6 Business
  State Route 6 Spur
  State Route 8
  State Route 92
  State Route 120
  State Route 120 Alternate
  State Route 139
  State Route 280
  State Route 360
  State Route 401 (unsigned designation for I-75)
  State Route 402 (unsigned designation for I-20)
  State Route 407 (unsigned designation for I-285)
  State Route 417 (unsigned designation for I-575)

Airports
 Cobb County International Airport at McCollum Field
 Dobbins Air Reserve Base (where the U.S. president usually arrives when visiting Atlanta)

Rail
 Norfolk Southern through Mableton, Austell , Powder Springs
 CSX Transportation through Acworth, Kennesaw, Marietta, Smyrna, and Vinings
 Georgia Northeastern Railroad A Shortline Line north from Marietta
Until 1971, the Louisville & Nashville Railroad, running on tracks now owned by CSX, operated passenger trains through Marietta depot.

Mass transit
 Xpress GA/RTA commuter buses and CobbLinc Marietta/Cobb Counties Transit System serve the county. MARTA also has connecting bus service to the Cumberland, Georgia business district in the southeastern part of the county.

Recreation

 American Adventures (Marietta)
 Chattahoochee River National Recreation Area
 Kennesaw Mountain National Battlefield Park (Kennesaw to Marietta)
 Lake Acworth/Acworth Beach (Acworth)
 Lake Allatoona (near Acworth)
 Mable House (Mableton)
 Marietta Confederate Cemetery (Marietta)
 Marietta Museum of History (Marietta)
 Marietta/Cobb Museum of Art (Marietta)
 Marietta National Cemetery (Marietta)
 Silver Comet Trail (Smyrna, Mableton, Powder Springs)
 Six Flags Over Georgia (Austell)
 Six Flags White Water (Marietta)
 Southern Museum of Civil War and Locomotive History (Kennesaw)

Venues
 Cobb County Civic Center
 Cobb Energy Performing Arts Center
 Mable House Amphitheater
 Truist Park

Communities

Cities
 Acworth
 Austell
 Kennesaw
 Marietta
 Powder Springs
 Smyrna

Census-designated places
 Fair Oaks
 Kennesaw State University
 Mableton
 Vinings

Unincorporated communities

 Chattahoochee Plantation
 Clarkdale
 Cumberland
 East Cobb
 Lost Mountain
 Mars Hill
 Mountain Ridge
 Noonday
 Powers Park
 Sandy Plains
 Spring Hill
 Town Center

Notable people

 Roy Barnes – Governor of Georgia, 1999–2003; born in Cobb County and worked there as a prosecutor
 Bob Barr – politician; United States Representative, Republican Party; Libertarian Party candidate for President of the United States
 Big Boss Man (Ray Traylor) – professional wrestler; corrections officer
 James V. Carmichael – member of the Georgia General Assembly, 1935–1940; candidate for governor of Georgia, 1946
 Louie Giglio – pastor, author, founder of the Passion Conferences, pastor of Passion City Church in Atlanta, head of sixstepsrecords
 Lil Yachty – rapper

Sister county
  Seongdong-gu, South Korea

See also

 National Register of Historic Places listings in Cobb County, Georgia
List of counties in Georgia

References

External links
 Cobb County government
 Cobb County historical marker

 
Cobb
1832 establishments in Georgia (U.S. state)
Populated places established in 1832
Majority-minority counties in Georgia